This page provides links to detailed lists of moth species that have been recorded in Canada. The lists are sorted by family.

Macro moths
 Bombycidae
 Cossidae
 Zygaenidae
 Limacodidae
 Sesiidae
 Lasiocampidae
 Saturniidae
 Drepanidae
 Mimallonidae
 Geometridae
 Uraniidae
 Sphingidae
 Notodontidae
 Thaumetopoeidae
 Lymantriidae
 Arctiidae
 Nolidae
 Noctuidae

Micro moths
 Micromoths

See also
 List of butterflies of Canada
 List of damselflies of Canada
 List of dragonflies of Canada

 
 
Canada
Moths